Mark Andreas Sheppard (born 30 May 1964) is an English actor and musician. He is often credited as Mark A. Sheppard. Sheppard is known for playing the demon/King of Hell Crowley on Supernatural and for his recurring roles as lawyer Romo Lampkin on the Battlestar Galactica reboot, Interpol investigator James Sterling on Leverage, and small-time crime lord Badger on Joss Whedon's Firefly.

Career

Music
The son of actor W. Morgan Sheppard and Regina Lisa ( Scherer) Sheppard, at age 15, Mark became a professional musician and enjoyed many years as a recording and touring artist with bands including Robyn Hitchcock, the Television Personalities and the Irish group Light a Big Fire. Mark played drums on Light a Big Fire's second album. As a session musician, he recorded albums for many groups throughout Europe, and eventually moved to Indonesia.

Stage
Sheppard starred in the American production of the play Cock and Bull Story (directed by Midnight Express author Billy Hayes), for which he won numerous awards, including the 1992 L.A. Drama Critics' Circle award, and the LA Weekly and Dramalogue awards.

Television
Sheppard's television work includes the following: the "Fire" episode of The X-Files, a year on the Jerry Bruckheimer action series Soldier of Fortune, guest-starring and recurring roles on The Practice, The Invisible Man, Special Unit 2, JAG, Star Trek: Voyager, The Chronicle, CSI: Crime Scene Investigation, CSI: NY, Monk, and Las Vegas, among others. He played a demon named Arnon on an episode titled
"Witches in Tights" on the TV series Charmed. He played Badger, a semi-comical cockney-style crime boss in the short-lived Joss Whedon show Firefly and later cast again in another Whedon show, Dollhouse as Paul Ballard's dismissive FBI superior. He appeared as a villain in season five of the Fox show 24 and as Patricia Arquette's reincarnated Jack the Ripper-style serial killer nemesis on Medium. He appeared as Romo Lampkin in seasons three and four of Battlestar Galactica, and had a recurring role as Manservant Neville in ABC Family's short-lived The Middleman. He has been seen as Anthony Anthros on Bionic Woman, as Sterling the nemesis character on Leverage, as the King of Hell Crowley on Supernatural, and as bank robber Tom Prescott on an episode of Burn Notice.

He appeared in the pilot episode of White Collar as a villainous master forger and as the Director of the Ring criminal organisation in Chuck. He appeared in the SyFy series Warehouse 13 as Regent Benedict Valda. He appears in the 2011 Doctor Who episodes "The Impossible Astronaut" and "Day of the Moon" playing the character Canton Everett Delaware III. In October 2013, Sheppard returned to White Collar, reprising his 2009 role as master forger Curtis Hagen.

Film
His film credits include the Jim Sheridan film In the Name of the Father, starring opposite Daniel Day-Lewis and Emma Thompson as Guildford Four member Patrick Armstrong; the romantic comedy Lover's Knot; the Russian historical drama Out of the Cold; the thriller Unstoppable; and with Heather Graham and Jeremy Sisto in the dark independent, Broken. He also starred in Megalodon and New Alcatraz.

Mark Sheppard directed his father, actor W. Morgan Sheppard. in the film Room 101, and co-starred with him in the psychological thriller Nether World, which the younger Sheppard also co-produced. The elder Sheppard played the older version of his son's character in the aforementioned Doctor Who and NCIS episodes.

Video games
He voiced the role of protagonist Michael Ford in The Conduit, whose mentor, John Adams, was voiced by W. Morgan Sheppard.

Double casting
Sheppard was cast with his father (who died in 2019) as the same character on three occasions, each playing the character at different ages:
 Canton Everett Delaware III in the Doctor Who episode "The Impossible Astronaut";
 War criminal Marcin Jarek a.k.a. "Mr. Pain" in the NCIS episode "Broken Bird"; and
 Captain Nemo in the 2010 film Jules Verne's Mysterious Island, which Mark also directed.

In the Macgyver reboot episode, "Cigar Cutter", which first aired 14 April 2017, he plays an assassin who assumes the identity of murder victim "Dr. Zito", a role his father played in the original series, except "Dr. Zito" was the name of the killer.

Voice
Since 2011, Mark Sheppard has been "The Voice" of BBC America promos and announcements.

Personal life
Sheppard and his first wife, Jessica, married on 6 March 2004, and have two sons, Max and Will. They divorced on 23 December 2014. On 9 November 2015, Sheppard married Australian heiress Sarah Louise Fudge. They celebrated their union in a private ceremony a year later on 19 November 2016 in Malibu, California. On 1 March 2016, their daughter, Isabella Rose, was born.

Filmography

Film roles

Television roles

Video game roles

References

External links

 
 

English male film actors
English male stage actors
English male television actors
English people of German descent
English people of Irish descent
English expatriates in the United States
Living people
1964 births
Male actors from London
Musicians from London
English rock drummers